Phreatobacter oligotrophus is a bacterium from the genus of Phreatobacter which has been isolated from ultrapure water from a power plant in Hungaria.

References 

Hyphomicrobiales
Bacteria described in 2014